Gavin Johnson may refer to:

Gavin Johnson (footballer) (born 1970), English former footballer
Gavin Johnson (rugby union) (born 1966), former South African rugby union player